Russ is a masculine given name, often a short form of Russell, and also a surname.

People

Given name or nickname
 Russ Abbot (born 1947), British musician, comedian and actor
 Russ Adams (born 1980), American retired baseball player
 Russ Barenberg (born 1950), American bluegrass musician
 Russ Conway (1925–2000), stage name of Trevor Stanford, English popular music pianist
 Russ Feingold, American politician
 Russ Freeman (pianist) (1926–2002), American bebop jazz pianist and composer
 Russ Freeman (guitarist) (born 1960), American jazz fusion guitarist, composer and bandleader
 Russ Granik, longtime Deputy Commissioner of the National Basketball Association
 Russ Grimm (born 1959), American retired football player
 Russ Hodge (born 1939), American decathlete, world record holder (1966–1967)
 Russ Howard (born 1956), Canadian curler
 Russ Kingston, American actor, editor and filmmaker
 Russ Kun (born 1975), President of Nauru (2022–)
 Russ Letlow (1913–1987), American football player
 Russ Malkin (born 1960), British film producer and creative director
 Russ Method (1897–1971), American football player
 Russ Meyer (1922–2004), American film director, producer and screenwriter
 Russ Meyer (baseball) (1923–1998), American baseball pitcher
 Russ Peterson (gridiron football) (1905–1971), American football player
 Russ Peterson (coach), American college basketball, football and baseball coach
 Russ W. Peterson (1916–2011), American politician
 Russ Ptacek (born 1963), American journalist
 Russ Roberts (born 1954), American economist
 Russ Smith (guard) (1893–1958), American football player
 Russ Smith (running back) (1944–2001), American football player
 Russ Smith (basketball) (born 1991), American basketball player
 Russ Smith (publisher) (born 1955), American newspaper publisher and columnist
 Russ Snyder (born 1934), American retired baseball player
 Russ Tamblyn (born 1934), American actor
 Russ Thomas (1924–1991), American football player
 Russ (rapper) (born 1992), American rapper
 Russ Washington (1946–2021), American football player
 Russ Westbrook (born 1988), American basketball player
 Russ Witherby (born 1962), American coach and former ice dancer
 Russ Yeast (born 1999), American football player

Surname
 Hannah Russ, zooarchaeologist
 Joanna Russ (1937–2011), American feminist science fiction author
 John Russ (disambiguation), several people
 Karl Russ (1833–1899), German aviculturist and writer
 Marco Russ (born 1985), German footballer
 Martin Faxon Russ (1931–2010), American author and professor
 Robert Russ (painter) (1847–1922), Austrian painter
 Robert D. Russ (1933–1997), United States Air Force general
 Robert Edwin Russ (1830–1902), planter and founder of Ruston, Louisiana
 Semp Russ (1878–1978), American college football quarterback and tennis player in the 1904 Olympics
 Tim Russ (born 1956), American actor
 William Russ (born 1950), American actor

Fictional characters
 Russ Owen, on the British soap opera ''Hollyoaks

See also
 Rus (disambiguation)
 Russell (disambiguation)
 Russell (given name)
 Russell (surname)

English masculine given names
English-language masculine given names
Hypocorisms